The Chinese Basketball Association rebounding leaders are the season by season individual rebounding leaders of the Chinese Basketball Association (CBA). The criteria set is that the player must play in a certain amount of games wherein he amassed the highest possible average to lead the league in the said statistic. 

These records only record after the CBA was established in 1995.

CBA rebounding leaders

References

External links
 CBA league official website 

Chinese Basketball Association awards